Hanna in Society (Swedish: Hanna i societén) is a 1940 Swedish comedy film directed by Gunnar Olsson and starring Rut Holm, Carl Barcklind and Elsa Carlsson.

The film's art direction was by Max Linder and Bibi Lindström.

Cast
 Rut Holm as Hanna Lundström  
 Carl Barcklind as Col. Rutger Hummerberg  
 Elsa Carlsson as Lucie Hummerberg 
 Einar Axelsson as Baltzar Hummerberg  
 Dagmar Ebbesen as Kristin  
 Bengt Djurberg as El-Johansson  
 Eivor Landström as Monika Hummerberg  
 Åke Ohberg as Lawyer  
 Karl-Arne Holmsten as Gösta Björnberg  
 Sven-Bertil Norberg as Douglas  
 Stig Järrel as Journalist  
 Hugo Björne as Ludvig Hummerberg  
 Harry Roeck-Hansen as Adolf Hummerberg  
 Barbro Flodquist as Kitti  
 Bengt Ekerot as Fred Hummerberg  
 Kaj Hjelm as Bertil  
 Arne Lindblad as Hairdresser  
 Eric Fröling as Lunder  
 Alli Halling as Charlotte  
 Ragnar Falck as Knäppis  
 Carl Ström as Man  
 Julie Bernby as Woman at the beauty shop  
 Georg Blickingberg as Dr. Santesson  
 Julia Cæsar as Representative for the Housemaid's Association  
 Karin Lannby as Woman at the hat department  
 Vera Lindby as Woman dancing with Johansson  
 Gunnar Olsson as Sundin  
 Manetta Ryberg as Woman at the tea party

References

Bibliography 
 Alfred Krautz. International directory of cinematographers, set- and costume designers in film, Volume 5. Saur, 1986.

External links 
 

1940 films
Swedish comedy films
1940 comedy films
1940s Swedish-language films
Films directed by Gunnar Olsson
Swedish black-and-white films
1940s Swedish films